Sixto Ibáñez (born 2 April 1909, date of death unknown) was an Argentine racewalker who competed in the 1948 Summer Olympics.

References

1909 births
Year of death missing
Argentine male racewalkers
Olympic athletes of Argentina
Athletes (track and field) at the 1948 Summer Olympics
Pan American Games gold medalists for Argentina
Pan American Games medalists in athletics (track and field)
Athletes (track and field) at the 1951 Pan American Games
Medalists at the 1951 Pan American Games
20th-century Argentine people